The climate of Islamabad is a humid subtropical climate (Köppen climate classification) with four seasons: a pleasant Spring (March–April), a hot Summer (May–August), a warm dry Autumn (September—October), and a cold Winter (November—February). The hottest month is June, where average highs routinely exceed . The wettest month is July, with heavy rainfall and evening thunderstorms with the possibility of cloudburst. The coldest month is January, with temperatures variable by location. In Islamabad, temperatures vary from cold to mild, routinely dropping below zero. In the hills there is sparse snowfall. On 23 July 2001, Islamabad received a record breaking  of rainfall in just 10 hours. It was the heaviest rainfall in Pakistan during the past 100 years. Following is the weather observed over Islamabad Airport, which is actually located in Rawalpindi.

Factors
The Monsoon and the Western Disturbance are the two main factors that change the weather over Islamabad; otherwise, Continental air prevails for rest of the season. Following are the main factors that influence the weather over Islamabad.
Western Disturbances occur almost every month in the city, but peaking during the winter months and causes moderate to heavy rainfall, temperature also decreases due to it. 
Fog does occur during the winter season and remains for weeks; especially near Margalla Hills.
Dust storms occur during summer months with peak in April and May. These dust storms are quite violent.
Southwest Monsoon occurs in summer from the month of June till September. These monsoon rains are quite heavy by nature and can cause severe flooding if they interact with westerly waves.
Continental air prevails during the period when there is no precipitation in the city.

Monthly weather conditions
The following is the monthly summary of the climatic conditions in Islamabad.

January

January is the coldest month of Islamabad. In January the weather of Islamabad is cold with some nights dropping easily below 0 °C. Most days are clear blue skies, however this month is prone to foggy nights and mornings. Near zero visibility is experienced during extremely foggy nights that absolutely hampers air traffic and motorways. The intensity of Rainfall in this month is moderate to fairly-heavy like in the western disturbance season of the city. Snowfall on higher elevations of Margalla Hills is not uncommon as it happens every year or after every few years. There have been rare instances of snowfall in the city (February 1984). The average rainfall for this month is 59mm at Zero Point official observatory and 56mm at Chaklala (old airport). Western Disturbance has a great influence in the winter of the city. It produces rains and sometimes hailstorms. While the highest rainfall for this month is  recorded at Zero Point in 1995.

February
The weather of Islamabad in February is warmer than that of January. The weather remains mild. Western Disturbance causes rainfall just like in January but the frequency and intensity of western disturbances is more than that of January. Average rainfall is relatively greater than January totaling to 84.1 millimetres at Chaklala airport and 89mm at Zero Point official observatory (3.31 in). In 2013, record (Highest) rainfall of 306.1 millimetres (12.05 in) at Chaklala airport was observed and a thunderstorms breakout was experienced from three western disturbances that caused bizarre conditions of frequent hailstorms and 93 kilometres per hour (58 mph) wind gusts.[8] Moreover, hailstorms with thunderstorms are not a rare occurrence in this cool time of the year. Observations demonstrate that cold weather (below zero temperature) is not experienced after halfway through the month as plantation season officially begins during the last fortnight. On rare occasions, snowline has even dropped down just to 3000 feet in February because of which Margalla Hills have received heavy snowfall in some years (especially up to a total of 1.5 feet snow in 2005). On 11 February 2016 also, the Margalla Hills received good snowfall which could be clearly seen from the Islamabad city.

March
Spring starts and in this month, the weather starts to settle. In March the weather turns warmer making it very pleasant. Average relative humidity in this month is about 37%. Again Western Disturbance has an effect on the weather, producing rain and hail. It causes rains with strong winds. Western Disturbance has no timing, it affects the upper and northern parts of Pakistan including Islamabad in every month and season. March 2015 set a record rainfall of a massive 331.1 millimetres (13.04 in) at chaklala airport. A few strong thunderstorms develop every year during this month and sometimes these can accompanied by dust storms and gusts near hurricane force at 126 kilometres per hour (75 mph). Hailstorms are both greater in frequency and intensity during March and weather can quickly change during the day.

April
Another spring month with pleasant temperatures. April in Islamabad transitions from warm to hot during day time, while night temperatures begin to move from cool to warm. Typically, late April sees a sharp rise in both the day and night time temperatures. Mean high during daytime is 30.2 °C (86.4 °F), while nights enjoy a mean of 15.4 °C (59.7 °F). Record high for April is a very hot 40.6 °C (105.1 °F) recorded on 29 April 2006 at chaklala airport, on the other hand, a chilly low of 5.1 °C (41.2 °F) on 7 April 1994 have been witnessed. The weather at few times gets hot in this month. Humidity remains low in this month about 24%.

May
Start of summers, In May the weather gets very hot in the city. Humidity gets extremely low in May as compared to other month, which is of 19%. Evening thunderstorms can occur in this month accompanied by dust storms that give the citizens of Islamabad much awaited relief from the scorching heat.

June
June is the hottest month of Islamabad. Till the first week of June the weather is very dry. But in the middle of June Pre-Monsoon showers can start that come from South west Monsoon. Dust storms are common in this month which are locally called as 'Andhi'. On 23 June 2010, a massive dust storm of 81 mph (130 km/h) hit the city followed by drizzle before the storm, temperatures peaked above  for four consecutive days. On 1 June 2016, the most powerful windstorm in the history of Islamabad struck the city with estimated wind gusts of more than 175 km/h causing huge property damage, uprooting large number of trees and poles. Around 30–40 people died in Rawalpindi and islamabad due to that storm.

July
July is the start of Annual Monsoon season and the wettest month for Islamabad as well as for whole Pakistan that continues till September. In July Islamabad can see some very heavy falls of rain accompanied by Strong Thunderstorms and windstorms. These heavy Storms is due to the moisture coming from Arabian Sea and Bay of Bengal and sometimes if western disturbance interact with them then record rain can be seen. Humidity remains above 65%. The heaviest rain of the city was also recorded in this month when  rain occurred in just 10 hours on 23 July 2001 the continuous downpour lasted from 0600 to 1600 PST.
It was the heaviest short period rainfall in last six years reminding the cloud burst of 23 July 2001. While on 30 July 2010 heavy downpour of  occurred that caused flash floods in the city.

August
Monsoon rains intensify in August. The month of August is the most humid month for Islamabad. On 9 August 2011 a cloudburst in Islamabad that continued for three hours and yielded  of rain, flooded main streets. The year 2020 also saw record rains and caused havoc.

September
End of summer in which, day temperatures remain a bit high. But evenings, nights and mornings are quite pleasant. Temperature starts to drop more in the night. And by the end of September, summer seems to have gone away. And Autumn starts to approach. (but in resent years the month has become more hotter)It all depends on the rains. If there are much rains in September, weather will change quickly. If not, then the weather changes gradually. Monsoon rains continue till the first-week of September, but they can be showers till the end of the month. After that monsoon completely withdraws from the city. Western disturbances in september can cause strong windstorms with moderate to Heavy Rainfall.

October
The start of Autumn, with pleasant temperatures. Day temperature can be a bit high, which can cause discomfort in the sun, while travelling and sitting without a fan. But evenings, nights and mornings are very pleasant, which urge one to go for walks and for outings. October is the driest month in the city, though in recent years it has been raining a lot. Western disturbance affect the city which causes light rain. Sometimes thunderstorms occur, which cause the temperature to drop more. In the middle of October the night temperature starts to drop very fast and winds start to become very cold which causes more drop in temperature.

November

The Start of Winter month in the city And temperature starts to drop a lot. Mornings can become very chilly . Warm clothes are pulled out to wear. Some afternoons of November are a bit warm, in which people still avoid direct sunlight. While at times people like to work, play and even stand in the sun. Showers or hailstorms occur in this month too.

December
In the month of December the winter finally sets in, while the coldest winter of the city is observed in January, weather becomes quite chilly in December too. Hot drinks, like tea and coffee with soups become common in the city. Fish is one of the most enjoyed dish of winter. Rainfall in December is expected by western disturbance . Western Disturbance cause rain in this month.

Monsoon rainfall of Islamabad
Monsoon season starts by the end of June and prevails till the end of September. It just recorded  of rain during the Monsoon season in 2009. The record breaking rain fell in just 10 hours. It was the heaviest rainfall in Pakistan during the past 100 years . The following is the Monsoon rainfall in Islamabad since 2006 based on the data from Pakistan Meteorological Department.

 In 2006, a total of  rain was recorded.
 In 2007, a total of  rain was recorded.
 In 2008, a total of  rain was recorded.

Cloud burst of 23 July 2001

On 23 July 2001, Islamabad received a record breaking 620 millimetres (24 in) of rainfall in just 10 hours. It was the heaviest rainfall in Pakistan during the past 100 years. Continuous downpour in lasted for about 10 hours from 0600–1600 PST in Islamabad, caused the worst ever Flash Flood in the local stream called "Nulla Lai" and its tributaries, which swept away low-lying areas of the twin cities. The neighbour city, Rawalpindi also experienced  of rain on the same day. According to the official figures, at least 10 people died, 800 houses were destroyed and 1069 houses were partially damaged in Islamabad.

Cloud burst of 28 July 2021

On 28 July 2021, heavy rains started after the cloudburst in Islamabad, Pakistan, caused flood situation in many parts of the federal capital and killed two people.[1][2] Several vehicles were swept away in the floods and water entered the basement of houses and plazas in Sector E-11, F-10 and D-12. 116 mm of rain was recorded at the personal weather station in E-11/4 Islamabad.[3][4][5]

Pakistan Meteorological Departments in Islamabad
 National Seismic Monitoring and Tsunami Early Warning Center, Islamabad (Backup Station)
Research & Development Islamabad
 Meteorological Forecasting Offices (mainly for Aviation purposes) Karachi, Lahore, Islamabad/Rawalpindi
Remote sensing, Islamabad
 Drought, Environmental monitoring & early warning Center Islamabad
 Weather stations are located at Headquarters of PMD (Zero point), Saidpur Village, Golra Sharif, Bokra. However, the headquarters also control operations of the weather stations located in Rawalpindi; namely, Islamabad Airport (Chaklala), Shamasabad, and Qasim Airbase (Dhamial Camp)

See also
 2001 Islamabad cloud burst
 Climate of Pakistan
 Climate of Rawalpindi
 Developments in Islamabad
 List of extreme weather records in Pakistan

References

External links
 Pakistan Meteorological Department
 Climate Data Of Islamabad

Islamabad
Islamabad